Peep Show is a British sitcom starring David Mitchell and Robert Webb. The series follows the lives of two men from their twenties to thirties who live in a flat in Croydon, London. Mark Corrigan (Mitchell), who has steady employment for most of the series, and his lodger, Jeremy "Jez" Usbourne (Webb), an unemployed would-be musician, are the main characters of the show. It was shown on Channel 4 from 2003 to 2015.

Major characters
Characters appear in all series unless otherwise specified.

Mark Corrigan
Mark Corrigan (portrayed by David Mitchell) is the miserly, vindictive owner of the flat (in Apollo House) which he shares with Jeremy. Mark is portrayed to be responsible, articulate (both in his inner thoughts and his outer speech) and relatively intelligent, at least compared to most of the other characters. He is also pessimistic, unhappy and socially and sexually awkward. He had a miserable upbringing, and is terrified of his father, who is gruff and difficult. He is a graduate in Business Studies from the fictional Dartmouth University, where he met Jeremy. He passed 7 GCSEs, and he has a love of history, especially ancient history—which he originally wanted to study at university, before being pressured by his parents into reading business studies instead. He often makes references to history - including Nazi Germany and The Second World War - in relation to events that happen in his day-to-day life. 

Mark is convinced that Jeremy's laziness, lack of logical rigour and indifference towards cultural pursuits are markers of low intellect, but often looks to him for social guidance. He is plagued by paranoia as to how others perceive him, and by doubts over whether his actions are normal. In spite of his thoughtful and sensible exterior and his tendency to act as the moral center of his surroundings, he has frequent bouts of selfishness, schadenfreude and impulsive behaviour. He loathes many aspects of modern culture, such as drug use and openness of sexuality; Mark often simply endures activities that others around him enjoy, as “the price you pay to avoid loneliness”. 

Mark's political sympathies are arguably the most developed of any character on the show, and yet they retain some ambiguity. He appears to be politically rational, if socially the exact opposite. He is mildly Eurosceptic and often ticks many centrist and a few socially conservative boxes, although it is unclear whether this is out of true political political conviction or the aforementioned wish to blend into what he considers the center of gravity of society. In the second series he does not seem to mind to be associated with the notion that “Tony Blair isn't such a bad thing”, but in the fifth series, he claims "nobody wanted New Labour" and shows admiration for the Liberal Democrats’ Paddy Ashdown. What seems to be clear is that he is uncomfortable with and oft-irritated by political correctness and praises “the miracle of consumer capitalism”, albeit often with pessimistic acceptance rather than enthusiasm. And he seems to genuinely abhor bigotry and far-right politics, which in Series 2 causes him to lose one of the few true friends he had made onscreen aside from Jez. He often criticises those who believe in God, but has been seen praying in times of extreme panic.  Although it is never stated in the show, his surname is of Irish origin. 

When the series starts, Mark has already been a loan manager at a London branch of JLB (a Frankfurt-based loan and credit company) for around four years, at least judging from the timing given by Jez in Series 2. His time at JLB comes to a close when the branch closes down in the first episode of Series 6; later on, Mark works as a waiter at the Mexican restaurant Banditos, a bathroom equipment salesman at Bath, Bathrooms, and Fittings, and finally again as a loan manager at the fictional Met City Bank with his former boss Alan Johnson. He is fired in the series finale, partly because of Jeremy's belated reaction to an abusive loan Mark had set up for him at the bank.

Mark's obsession with Sophie and his relationship with her (which is his first), is a major storyline of the first four series. Following their disastrous wedding and separation immediately afterwards, he pursues a series of other women during series 5, wondering whether each could be "the one". After a one-night stand with Sophie following their breakup, she becomes pregnant and later gives birth to Mark's son.

Mark's only other relationship is with Dobby, whom he meets at JLB shortly after splitting from Sophie. Like with Sophie, Mark gradually succeeds in getting closer to Dobby and ultimately entering a relationship with her, but Dobby leaves him at the end of series 8 for a job in New York. She returns in series 9 with an American boyfriend, a new look and a more upbeat attitude, and Mark becomes less attracted to her as a result.

In the final series – 9 – he has a fling with April, whom he knew briefly years earlier, who is now unhappily married to a middle-aged man, Angus. Mark tries to poach her, but fails in the show's finale when he allows Jeremy and Super Hans to kidnap Angus and hold him captive in their flat, which she discovers.

Jeremy Usbourne
Jeremy 'Jez' Usbourne (portrayed by Robert Webb) is a "work-shy freeloader" who lives in the spare room of Mark's flat. He is selfish, juvenile and arrogant, but considers himself to be immensely talented and attractive. He is confident, but can sometimes come across as spiteful and stubborn. Although more socially skilled than Mark on a superficial level, his over-confidence and narcissism mean that in practice he is equally socially inept. 

Jez displays a readiness to engage in actions that are detrimental to his friends for his own gain, including ganging up on Mark with a bully, overdosing Mark on paracetamol to save a magic mushroom party and then angrily blaming him for the guests' departure, having sex with Sophie (and her mother), ruining some of Mark's onscreen relationships or relapsing Super Hans into drug addiction. His relationship with Mark, which is by far the most developed throughout the series, oscillates between mutual, albeit poorly timed demonstrations of inconditional loyalty and acts and thoughts of deep envy and petty vindictiveness. Jeremy shows a tendency to seriously sabotage Mark's love and work life in ways that are sometimes the result of selfish opportunism, but other times appear to be the unwanted outcome of genuine kindness.

Jez attended Dartmouth with Mark and graduated with a degree in nursing. Jez was a nurse for a while, but quit because he was "disgusted at having to help people". He also receives financial support from his mother, despite maintaining an estranged relationship with her. For most of the series, he pursues a musical career with his friend Super Hans, in a band with no consistent name, despite having little musical talent or skill. In later series he claims to become a "life coach", despite having no ability to do that either. As well as being lazy, Jez is financially reckless, never opens his bank statements, and has apparently spent a "nest-egg" given to him by his mother. He is unaware of how bank loans work, he expresses annoyance at the effort taken to travel to the job centre once a week to claim unemployment benefit, and despite Mark's protestations, bizarrely claims that inheriting £20,000 from a great aunt will make him a "millionaire". Neither the threat or the reality of becoming destitute encourages Jeremy to try and earn money and pay his own way.

Jez is free-spirited, popular with women in the short-term, and enjoys recreational drugs as well as casual sex, although he has several emotionally attached relationships. His first major love interest during the series is Nancy, whom he marries in order to allow her to stay in the UK; she leaves him after he admits to having sex with Toni. He later has a fling with Big Suze, whom he split from shortly before the series began. She leaves him when he tries to convince her to have sex with Johnson for money. During series 6, he has a relationship with Elena, during which he discovers that she is in a long-term same-sex relationship relationship with Gail; he later reveals the affair to Gail. In series 7 he has a fling with Zahra, who lives with her partner Ben. After Zahra and Ben separate, Jez resumes his relationship with her, but she leaves him after he attempts to have sex with Super Hans's girlfriend. In series 8, Jeremy discovers he is in love with Dobby and ruins Mark's plan to propose to her, thereby putting a six-month hiatus on their friendship. In series 9, he enters a same-sex relationship with Joe - who is over a decade younger than him. Jez pretends to be a year younger than he is, which leads to Joe leaving him at his 40th birthday party, in the finale.

Super Hans
Portrayed by Matt King, Jeremy's bandmate and friend, ’Super’ Hans is an untrustworthy selfish fantasist who very frequently uses recreational drugs. His musical skills are implied to be only marginally better than Jeremy's, and at least part of his role (which in Season 2 Jeremy is briefly asked to fill in for) seems to be to merely front for other bands, "hit a few keys on the sequencer, make a bit of a show". Hans' real name is Simon (as revealed during his wedding to Molly in series 9). He experiences a crack cocaine addiction in the second series, remarking "that crack is really moreish", later referenced again in the final episode of the third series and in the seventh series. 
 
In spite of the damage he routinely causes to his brain, he is portrayed to be a fast thinker, and the drug-addled stream-of-consciousness that passes for his normal speech is occasionally insightful and indicative of a huge volume of pop-culture knowledge. His professed political beliefs appear to be closer to the far-left of the political spectrum (probably some warped, sui generis form of left-wing anarchism combined with a willingness to provoke outrage) but given that his thoughts are not audible as voice-overs, it is difficult to know how much he truly adheres to anything he says. He ostensibly had a rough childhood which included being locked up by his father to "monitor the home brew." He seems to be unfazed and unaffected by things that would shock, scare or repulse others, but he does appear to have his limits as well, as exemplified by a New Year's Eve party that is too disturbing even for him in the series 7 final episode. 

Hans' contentious opinions often contradict Jeremy's ideas. His tough-love attitude towards Jeremy thinly masks a readiness to betray him whenever it suits him, e.g. edging him out of band projects, stealing his love interests, claiming sole ownership of shared song credits or having Jeremy take the blame for his own drug use and then leaving him temporarily homeless in order to save his marriage. His relationship with Mark, on the other hand, is tolerant - although the two have very little in common, Hans seems less concerned by Mark's social awkwardness than others, and even expresses sincere and unprompted appreciation of Mark's character and friendship on the evening before Hans' wedding, while Mark is often surprisingly forgiving of Hans' eccentric and destructive behaviour. 
 
He works in a recording studio in the first series. At the end of series five he and Jeremy join a religious cult whose teachings resemble a cross between Scientology and the theories of Wilhelm Reich, and Hans has (or feigns) a much deeper commitment to their beliefs than Jeremy. During the finale of the sixth series he says that he is father to eight-year-old twins who have an opaque connection to the German language. In series five, he says that he is barred from entering some EU countries. He is of constant surprise to the others, including in the last episode of the seventh series in which he has apparently found the love of his life, a previously unseen young East Asian woman, who speaks no English, but a tiny bit of German. In the final series he marries a woman called Molly. Because of her hatred for Jeremy, Hans asks Mark to be his best man at their wedding. However, she leaves Hans after he kidnaps Angus in an attempt to help Mark. At the wedding, it is revealed that Hans's real name is Simon, and two young boys are present who seem to be the aforementioned twins. At the end of the series, he decides to go to Macedonia and open a moped rental shop. Russell Brand originally auditioned for the part. Hans was inspired by the character Danny from the film Withnail and I.

Alan Johnson
Alan Johnson (portrayed by Paterson Joseph) is a senior loan manager at JLB. Usually referred to and addressed simply as "Johnson", he becomes friends with Mark after meeting him at work. During series 2, he becomes Mark's boss. His approach to life in general and business in particular is basically an aggressive, social Darwinian apology of the survival of the fittest and borderline fascistic, as seen in his eulogy for Gerard in series 8. Although a confident, suave and intelligent businessman and apparently a pillar of the community, he was previously an alcoholic for 15 years. Mark continues to get on well with Johnson despite some misunderstandings, and Johnson is one of the few people who takes Mark's side after the breakdown of his marriage to Sophie. Johnson and Jez dislike each other from the start, even more so after Big Suze leaves Jez for him. During series 6, after the termination of the UK JLB operation, he lives in a council house with Suze, referred to by Mark as his "recession residence" and shows delusions due to his fall from power. He swindles Mark out of £2000 by attempting to make him an executive in a new consultancy agency. In the final episode of series 7, he throws away his sobriety during a new year party. He drives an E39 520i BMW, but later on during the show is seen being driven in an E65 7 series BMW.

Sophie Chapman
(series 1–7, guest series 9) Portrayed by Olivia Colman, Sophie is a colleague and love interest for both Mark and Jeff. She is initially in a relationship with Jeff, but leaves him and starts a relationship with Mark. She marries him, then immediately separates from him. Her family live in the countryside, and she begins drinking heavily and taking drugs. She is less friendly with, or respected by, their boss Johnson than Mark is. Dobby and Johnson are the only people in the office to take Mark's side after their disastrous wedding. At the start of series 6, she discovers that she is pregnant with Mark, Jez, or Jeff's child. By the end, a DNA test proves that Mark is the father. In the first episode of series 7, their son is born. Despite his greatest efforts, Sophie is let down throughout series 6 and 7 by Mark concerning his responsibilities as a father, including unintentionally missing the christening of his son and therefore losing his rights to name his own baby as punishment. Sophie is mentioned - but does not appear - in series 8. She returns in series 9 for one episode where she offers Mark the chance to live with her and their son at her grandmother's cottage, which she had gained after her death. Mark initially agrees for baby Ian's sake, but changes his mind in favour of pursuing April.

Jeff Heaney
Portrayed by Neil Fitzmaurice. Jeff is a colleague of Mark and Sophie's at JLB and an intimidating, manly bully from Merseyside. He repeatedly clashes verbally and occasionally physically with Mark, not least for the attentions of Sophie, who chooses Jeff but leaves him after he kisses another woman. In the later series, as Mark and Sophie's relationship takes its course, he is frequently seen mocking Mark. After their relationship falls apart, Jeff appears to gradually get close to Sophie again. Mark's anger over this peaks when Sophie even considers naming their child 'Geoff'. However, Sophie sees no connection between this name and that of Mark's rival, instead claiming that she takes it from her uncle. In series 7, he becomes the baby's godfather when Mark and Jez both fail to turn up on time, and it appears that Jeff and Sophie are back in a relationship by the end of the series, which is a major torment to Mark, who constantly believes that his son will think Jeff is his father. Jeff confirms they are back together when he comes to Mark's house to collect the baby in series 8. Jeff returns in the very last episode in series 9, no longer with Sophie but once again working for Alan when Mark is fired from his new job.

Dobby
(Series 5–9) Portrayed by Isy Suttie. Dobby works in the IT department of JLB and is a self-described misfit, much like Mark. She tells Mark that her real name is Debbie, but everyone calls her Dobby. She has many interests that are similar to those of Mark, including MMORPGs. Mark meets her in series 5 episode 2 in the office canteen and quickly develops strong feelings for her, as does Mark's colleague Gerard soon after. Dobby expresses obvious interest in, and feelings for Mark in the first episodes, and even takes the bulk of the sexual initiative during their first encounters. However, Mark's failure to act on those first overtures and ask her out properly from the beginning, coupled with his general emotional and social immaturity once they start dating, as well as negative circumstantial influence (including Sophie's pregnancy and a disastrous Christmas lunch), leads to an at-times difficult relationship, and she is strongly implied to gradually lose interest in it. By the end of series 7, Mark invites Dobby to move into his flat, and he spends series 8 unsuccessfully encouraging her to do so, while Jez secretly falls in love with her. While Dobby wants to go interrailing across Europe with Mark, he decides the best way to keep her is to ask her to marry him in the Quantocks, as he did with Sophie in series 3. However, Jeremy sabotages this event by revealing his feelings for her to Mark and creating an altercation that results in Dobby walking off to go to New York. In series 9, Dobby returns and meets Mark and the two are friendly towards each other. Just as Mark finally gets over his infatuation with her, he is beaten up by her boyfriend Gregory after he discovers that Mark has been stalking her online for months.

Big Suze
(played by Sophie Winkleman, series 3–7)
Big Suze lived with Jez in a flat (which he nostalgically refers to as the "love shack") for around a year and a half, prior to the start of the first series of the show. She is occasionally mentioned from series 1 but does not make an appearance until her introduction as a major supporting character in the third series. Suze is posh and is an actress, but between roles works as a waitress in a café. Jez is desperate to get back together with her, and although they reunite briefly, she later leaves him for Alan Johnson. Her nickname comes from her being tall. Her appearance in the third series was intended for Nancy, but Rachel Blanchard was unavailable. During series 6, her relationship with Johnson is troubled, leading to their breakup in series 7, and her throwing a separate New Year's Eve party, resulting in Johnson relapsing into drinking alcohol.

Minor characters

April Danecroft
(Catherine Shepherd, (s2 & 9). A Dartmouth University student and shoe salesgirl who has the magical combination of beauty and low self-esteem. Mark pretends to be doing the same course as her at Dartmouth in order to meet her there. He fails in his attempt to have casual sex with her. She returns in s9 as a successful historian and is unhappily married to boring middle-aged historian Angus. She has a fling with Mark.

Gerard Matthew
(Jim Howick, s4–8). Mark's colleague at JLB, and later, his rival for Dobby's affections. He has health problems which sometimes result in a need for a tube up his nose. He has similar interests to Dobby - including MMORPGs and live action roleplay. Mark considers himself socially superior to him. In s7, he and Mark form The Dobby Club, an organisation of two who are committed to breaking Dobby up from her boyfriend Simon, deciding that the matter of which of them gets to date her if they succeed can be resolved afterwards. Each would readily betray the other if it meant getting what he wanted. Gerard dies of flu in the first episode of s8.

Gail Huggins
(Emily Bruni, s6-8). Elena's long-term girlfriend, a member of Mensa and a musician. She manages a Mexican restaurant, hiring Mark until she fires him shortly after in s7. In s8, she campaigns to be chairman of the freehold committee in Apollo House.

Simon
(Mathew Baynton, s7 & 8). Dobby's boyfriend for part of s7. During s8, Simon tries to get Dobby back after she reveals she is going to move in with Mark.

Ian Chapman
(Paul Clayton, s4–7). Sophie's homophobic, ultra-conservative father who lives with his wife and son in the countryside. He dislikes Mark, but most of the time silently resents him, rather than trying to break Sophie and Mark up. After Mark impregnates Sophie, he tries to persuade Mark to get back together with Sophie. Mark and Sophie's baby is named after him.

Zahra
(Camilla Marie Beeput, s7). A young woman whom Jez meets in a hospital waiting room while her partner Ben is in a coma. Ben regains consciousness and later employs Jez, in a role which Jez uses as a means to try to get close to, and eventually seduce, Zahra. She is interested in many refined subjects that are beyond Jez, such as foreign-language films and classic literature, including Frankenstein, which he pretends to know about and be interested in as a means to impress her. Jez and Zahra eventually have a fling, unbeknownst to Ben. When Ben and Zahra later break up, Zahra asks Jez to move in with her. She dumps him before he is able to accept her offer, because she finds out that he attempted to cheat on her.

Elena
(Vera Filatova, s6). Elena is an Eastern European immigrant who lives in the same block of flats as Mark and Jez. She works part-time as a legal secretary in human rights law and deals marijuana on the side. She has a sexual attraction towards fathers, is bisexual, and in a long-term relationship with Gail. She hides the relationship from Jez at the start of their fling, which goes on to become a secret affair. She likes spelt bread as she is wheat intolerant.

Nancy
(Rachel Blanchard, s2 & 4). Arriving in Britain from the US where she had a conservative upbringing, Nancy is hedonistic and carefree. Her attitude towards love and relationships is affected by her upbringing and her Christian beliefs clashing with her personality and desires, leading her to send her boyfriend Jez very mixed messages, from having adventurous, frequent sex to abstaining completely. She marries him to stay in the UK, but does not reciprocate his love for her.

Toni
(Elizabeth Marmur, s 1–2). The next-door neighbour of Mark and Jez, and an object of their affections throughout the first series of the show. She separates from her husband Tony (John Hodgkinson) in s1, but the couple reunite during s2, although they still argue. Her father died when she was three and she appears to be seeking a father figure. During her childhood she regularly went skiing. She has two sisters; one with cancer, and a half-sister. She is headstrong and liberal, and engages in casual sex with Jez on a few occasions. In s1 e2, she engages in pyramid selling, but at the end of s2 she is working as a supervisor in a call centre.

Ben
(Danny Babington, s7). Jez and Mark meet Ben - who is in a coma - and his partner Zahra in hospital where Mark and Jez accompany Sophie, who is giving birth to Mark's son. Jez works for Ben in order to spend time with Zahra, enabling Jez to have a fling with her.

Sarah Corrigan
(Eliza L. Bennett, s3 & 6-8). Mark's sister, a solicitor who aids Mark in regard to custody rights over his son. She first appears having split up with her husband. Jez quickly seduces her, much to Mark's chagrin which worsens when he has sex with her the same night they meet. Jez finishes with her very soon after he finds out Suze is single, but she continues to show a sexual interest in him every time she appears. Although Jez tries to avoid her, he briefly moves in with her and her son Joshy in s8, when he agrees to move out of Mark's flat but realises that he has nowhere to go.

Megan
(Cariad Lloyd, s9). A barmaid whom Jez meets during Super Hans' stag night. He gives her life coaching to help her pursue her dream job as an artist. Jez has an affair with her boyfriend Joe, and also ends up having sex with her behind his back. By coincidence, the two discover the other's cheating with Jez at the same time. Megan agrees to have a "threeism" with the two men based on a set of guidelines, but a dispute on who gets to be with who on which day results in Joe leaving Megan for Jez. Despite her anger towards Jez, Megan attends his 40th birthday, where she reunites with Joe after Jez breaks up with him.

Joe
(Bart Edwards, s9). Megan's boyfriend. Jez has sex with him on an impulse, which results in an ongoing relationship between the two. Jez also has sex with Megan, but chooses Joe over her. His older age prevents him from keeping up with Joe, and Jez pretends to be a year younger than he actually is when Jez's 40th birthday approaches. Joe buys him some tickets to spend a whole week raving together, but Jez declines, so Joe returns to Megan.

Big Mad Andy
(Liam Noble, s3 & 8). An emotionally volatile handyman whom Jez manages to befriend after Andy is tasked with repairing a bathroom door destroyed by Super Hans. Jez attempts to 'life coach' Andy in a futile and self-serving effort to treat Andy's patently urgent mental health problems. Andy is a heavy drinker who punches people when intoxicated in order to provoke a fight and have his own thoughts "punched out of him".

Jerry
(Tim Key, s9). Mark's colleague who moves in to Jeremy's old room. Although mild-mannered, cheerful, and ostensibly sharing a lot of Mark's more cultured interests (books, history), Jerry proves an irritant, and Mark wishes to return to his more low-brow domestic arrangement with Jeremy.

Overview

References

Channel 4-related lists
Lists of British sitcom television characters